American Gangster: Trap Queens is an American docuseries that premiered on BET+ on October 17, 2019.

On January 8, 2021, the series was renewed for a second season which premiered on January 14, 2021.

On March 31, 2022, the series was renewed for a third season which premiered on April 7, 2022.

Episodes

Season 1 (2019–20)

Season 2 (2021)

Season 3

References

External links

2010s American documentary television series
2019 American television series debuts
2020s American documentary television series
BET+ original programming
English-language television shows
Works about African-American organized crime